Listvennichnoye is a rural locality (a selo) in Pribaykalsky District, Republic of Buryatia, Russia. The population was 161 as of 2010. There are 5 streets.

Geography 
Listvennichnoye is located 11 km southwest of Turuntayevo (the district's administrative centre) by road. Itantsa is the nearest rural locality.

References 

Rural localities in Okinsky District